Carrowen railway station served Carrowen in County Donegal, Ireland.

The station opened on 1 December 1883 when the Londonderry and Lough Swilly Railway built their line from Londonderry Graving Dock to Letterkenny (LLS).

It closed for passengers on 3 June 1940.

It remained open for freight until 10 August 1953.

Routes

References

Disused railway stations in County Donegal
Railway stations opened in 1883
Railway stations closed in 1940
1883 establishments in Ireland
1940 disestablishments in Ireland
Railway stations in the Republic of Ireland opened in the 19th century